Word of God or God's Word may refer to:

Philosophical and religious terms
 Certain religious texts, in particular:
 The Bible
 The Quran
 Logos, in Western philosophy, psychology, rhetoric, and religion
 Logos (Christianity), a name or title of Jesus Christ, seen as the pre-existent second person of the Trinity
 Rhema, meaning "utterance" or "thing said" in Greek. In philosophy, it was used by both Plato and Aristotle to refer to propositions or sentences. In Christianity, it is used in reference to the concept of Rhematos Christou, Jesus Christ's sayings. 
 Rhema (doctrine), a divine revelation or inspiration given to an individual
 Dabar, meaning "word", "talk" or "thing" in Hebrew
 Divine language, the concept of a mystical or divine proto-language, which predates and supersedes human speech

Other uses
 Word of God (community), a charismatic community in Michigan
 Word of God (film), a 2017 Danish film
 God's Word Translation (GW), an English translation of the Bible by the God's Word to the Nations Society
 The Word of God, a superpower of Jesse Custer in the comic book series Preacher

See also
 Divine Word (disambiguation)